GreenPAC is a Canadian non-profit environmental organization, founded in 2014. Its goal is to help recruit, elect, and support environmental leadership in Canadian politics, across the political spectrum.

Thus far, GreenPAC has run endorsement campaigns in the Canadian federal elections of 2015, 2019, and 2021, and provincial elections including those of Manitoba in 2016, British Columbia in 2017, and Ontario in 2018 and 2022.

2015 federal election campaign
GreenPAC's first campaign was during the 2015 Canadian federal election, in which they endorsed 18 MP candidates from four national parties who were deemed to have strong environmental track records by a panel of Canadian environmental experts. Only candidates considered to be in winnable situations were endorsed.  GreenPAC encouraged Canadians to support these endorsed candidates' campaigns through donations or by volunteering.

The following 18 candidates were endorsed by GreenPAC in the 2015 federal election:

 William Amos, Liberal, Pontiac, QC: elected
 Richard Cannings, NDP, South Okanagan—West Kootenay, BC: elected
 Jim Carr, Liberal, Winnipeg South Centre, MB: elected
 Michael Chong, Conservative, Wellington—Halton Hills, ON: incumbent, re-elected
 François Choquette, NDP, Drummond, QC: incumbent, re-elected
 Nathan Cullen, NDP, Skeena—Bulkley Valley, BC: incumbent, re-elected
 Karine Desjardins, Liberal, Beloeil—Chambly, QC: not elected
 Fin Donnelly, NDP, Port Moody—Coquitlam, BC: incumbent (previously MP for New Westminster—Coquitlam), re-elected
 Kirsty Duncan, Liberal, Etobicoke North, ON: incumbent, re-elected
 Linda Duncan, NDP, Edmonton Strathcona, AB: incumbent, re-elected
 Terry Duguid, Liberal, Winnipeg South, MB: elected
 Bruce Hyer, Green, Thunder Bay—Superior North, ON: incumbent (previously NDP and independent), lost re-election bid
 Megan Leslie, NDP, Halifax, NS: incumbent, lost re-election bid
 Elizabeth May, Green, Saanich—Gulf Islands, BC: incumbent, re-elected
 Gord Miller, Green, Guelph, ON: not elected
 Joyce Murray, Liberal, Vancouver Quadra, BC: incumbent, re-elected
 Romeo Saganash, NDP, Abitibi—Baie-James—Nunavik—Eeyou, QC: incumbent, re-elected
 Dianne Watts, Conservative, South Surrey—White Rock, BC

2019 federal election campaign
During the 2019 Canadian federal election, GreenPAC endorsed 25 MP candidates from four national parties and one independent candidate who were deemed to have strong environmental track records by a panel of Canadian environmental experts. GreenPAC encouraged Canadians to support these endorsed candidates' campaigns through donations or by volunteering.

The following 25 candidates were endorsed by GreenPAC in the 2019 federal election:

 William Amos, Liberal, Pontiac, QC: incumbent, re-elected
 Taylor Bachrach, NDP, Skeena—Bulkley Valley, BC: elected
 Richard Cannings, NDP, South Okanagan—West Kootenay, BC: incumbent, re-elected
 Michael Chong, Conservative, Wellington—Halton Hills, ON: incumbent, re-elected
 François Choquette, NDP, Drummond, QC: incumbent, lost re-election bid
 Terry Duguid, Liberal, Winnipeg South, MB: incumbent, re-elected
 Kirsty Duncan, Liberal, Etobicoke North, ON: incumbent, re-elected
 Steve Dyck, Green, Guelph, ON: not elected
 Andy Fillmore, Liberal, Halifax, NS: incumbent, re-elected
 Joël Godin, Conservative, Portneuf—Jacques-Cartier, QC: incumbent, re-elected
 Steven Guilbeault, Liberal, Laurier—Sainte-Marie, QC: elected
 Gord Johns, NDP, Courtenay—Alberni, BC: incumbent, re-elected
 Anna Keenan, Green, Malpeque, PEI: not elected
 Racelle Kooy, Green, Victoria, BC: not elected
 Darcie Lanthier, Green, Charlottetown, PEI: not elected
 Larry Maguire, Conservative, Brandon—Souris, MB: incumbent, re-elected
 Elizabeth May, Green, Saanich—Gulf Islands, BC: incumbent, re-elected
 Dan Mazier, Conservative, Dauphin—Swan River—Neepawa, MB: elected
 Catherine McKenna, Liberal, Ottawa Centre, ON: incumbent, re-elected
 Gord Miller, Green, Parry Sound—Muskoka, ON: not elected
 Joyce Murray, Liberal, Vancouver Quadra, BC: incumbent, re-elected
 Joan Phillip, NDP, Central Okanagan—Similkameen—Nicola, BC: not elected
 Jane Philpott, Independent, Markham—Stouffville, ON: incumbent (previously Liberal), lost re-election bid
 Wayne Stetski, NDP, Kootenay—Columbia, BC: incumbent, lost re-election bid
 Rudy Turtle, NDP, Kenora, ON: not elected

2021 federal election campaign
During the 2021 Canadian federal election, GreenPAC endorsed 36 MP candidates from four national parties who were deemed to have strong environmental track records by a panel of Canadian environmental experts.

 Marilou Alarie, BQ, Brome—Missisquoi, QC: not elected
 Dan Albas, Conservative, Central Okanagan—Similkameen—Nicola, BC: incumbent, re-elected
 Anjali Appadurai, NDP, Vancouver Granville, BC: not elected
 Taylor Bachrach, NDP, Skeena—Bulkley Valley, BC: incumbent, re-elected
 Terry Beech, Liberal, Burnaby North—Seymour, BC: incumbent, re-elected
 Richard Cannings, NDP, South Okanagan—West Kootenay, BC: incumbent, re-elected
 Michael Chong, Conservative, Wellington—Halton Hills, ON: incumbent, re-elected
 Julie Dabrusin, Liberal,  Toronto—Danforth, ON: incumbent, re-elected
 Phil De Luna, Green, Toronto—St. Paul's, ON: not elected
 Tria Donaldson, NDP, Regina—Lewvan, SK: not elected
 Terry Duguid, Liberal, Winnipeg South, MB: incumbent, re-elected
 Kirsty Duncan, Liberal, Etobicoke North, ON: incumbent, re-elected
 Leah Gazan, NDP, Winnipeg Centre, MB: incumbent, re-elected
 Karina Gould, Liberal, Burlington, ON: incumbent, re-elected
 Matthew Green, NDP, Hamilton Centre, ON: incumbent, re-elected
 Steven Guilbeault, Liberal, Laurier—Sainte-Marie, QC: incumbent, re-elected
 Lori Idlout, NDP, Nunavut, NU: elected
 Gord Johns, NDP, Courtenay—Alberni, BC: incumbent, re-elected
 Peter Julian, NDP, New Westminster—Burnaby, BC: incumbent, re-elected
 Anna Keenan, Green, Malpeque, PEI: not elected
 Larry Maguire, Conservative, Brandon—Souris, MB: incumbent, re-elected
 Paul Manly, Green,  Nanaimo—Ladysmith, BC: incumbent, lost re-election bid
 Elizabeth May, Green, Saanich—Gulf Islands, BC: incumbent, re-elected
 Dan Mazier, Conservative, Dauphin—Swan River—Neepawa, MB: incumbent, re-elected
 Susan McArthur, Conservative, Glengarry—Prescott—Russell, ON: not elected
 Jesse McCormick, Liberal, Kamloops—Thompson—Cariboo, BC: not elected
 Heather McPherson, NDP, Edmonton—Strathcona, AB: incumbent, re-elected
 Mike Morrice, Green, Kitchener Centre, ON: elected
 Joyce Murray, Liberal, Vancouver Quadra, BC: incumbent, re-elected
 Mark Parent, Conservative, Kings—Hants, NS: not elected
 Monique Pauzé, BQ, Repentigny, QC: incumbent, re-elected
 Peter Schiefke, Liberal, Vaudreuil—Soulanges, QC: incumbent, re-elected
 Paul Taylor, NDP, Parkdale—High Park, ON: not elected
 Julie Vignola, BQ, Beauport—Limoilou, QC: incumbent, re-elected
 Jonathan Wilkinson, Liberal, North Vancouver, BC: incumbent, re-elected
 Lenore Zann, Liberal, Cumberland—Colchester, NS: incumbent, lost re-election bid

References

External links
 GreenPAC Website

Environmental organizations based in Ontario
Environmental organizations established in 2014
Organizations based in Toronto